XHKZ-FM is a radio station on 98.1 FM in Santo Domingo Tehuantepec, Oaxaca, Mexico.

History
XEKZ-AM 610 received its concession on June 4, 1959. It was owned by La Voz del Istmo de Tehuantepec, S.A., and broadcast with 1,000 watts day and 500 night. It was sold to its current concessionaire in 2000.

XEKZ received approval to migrate to FM in 2010.

From 2020 to 2022, the station was part of the El Heraldo Radio network, reverting to its prior format and name after two years.

References

Radio stations in Oaxaca